An Ecozone may refer to:

 Ecozone (Canada), one of 15 first-level ecological land classifications in Canada

 Biogeographic realm,  the broadest biogeographic division of Earth's land surface (referred to as ecozone by BBC)
 Biome, a large collection of flora and fauna occupying a major habitat
 Bioregion,  an ecologically and geographically defined area that is smaller than a biogeographical realm, but larger than an ecoregion
 Ecoregion, an ecologically and geographically defined area that is smaller than a bioregion

Biogeography